GeForce 8000 series is a series of Nvidia motherboard chipsets aimed at home theater PC and gaming pc solutions using CPUs by AMD (for its Intel CPUs equivalent see GeForce 9300 or GeForce 9400 chipsets).  The chipsets are capable of full 1080p Blu-ray and HD DVD playback with most processing being done by the integrated chipset from the motherboard and not requiring an additional video card.

Specifications

Available motherboards

See also
Comparison of Nvidia chipsets

References

External links
Early information on more boards that will be available
Other NVIDIA GeForce motherboard GPUs
Windows 7 compatible MCP product list by Nvidia, last updated 04/15/2010

Nvidia chipsets